Encoiloceras is a genus of Tainoceratids, a nautiloid cephalopod in the order Nautilida that has been found in Upper Triassic (Carnian) sediments in the Alps and Hungary.

Encoiloceras has an evolute shell with a wide umbilicus and large umbilical perforation in the middle.  The whorl section is subquadrate with a rounded venter. Flanks bear thick, foldlike, ribs that thicken at the ventral shoulders.  The suture has shallow lobes on all sides and the supuncle is close to the dorsum, i.e. to the inner rim.

Encoiloceras is similar to Anoploceras in that both have pronounced ribbing, although stronger in Encoiloceras, but differs in that Encoiloceras has a wide umbilical perforation, lacking in Anoploceras. It is also similar to  Enoploceras in that Enoploceras also has an umbilical perforation, although smaller, and lacks the strong ribbing of Encoiloceras.

References

 Bernhard Kummel, 1964.  Nautiloidea-Nautilida. Treatise on Invertebrate Paleontology, Part K. Geological Soc. of America and University of Kansas press. Teichert and Moore (eds)

Prehistoric nautiloid genera